In Search of a Lost Paradise is a 2015 German-Russian documentary by Evgeniy Tsymbal and Alexander Smoljanski which tells the story of Russian artist Valentina Kropivnitskaya and her husband, the artist Oscar Rabin.

Aside from the biography of the artists, the film also addresses their unconventional thoughts about twentieth-century art. The director, Evgeny Tsymbal, one of the most internationally acclaimed contemporary Russian documentary filmmakers (BAFTA, FIPRESCI and 30 other awards), recounts this refugee success story of an artist who was true to her talent and never gave into the pressures of life.

In Search of a Lost Paradise is the recipient of a Nika award 2016 for Best Documentary Feature.

Background 
In 1974, Rabin and Kropivnitskaya organized a prohibited open-air art exhibition, which was smashed by the KGB using bulldozers. The following day the event was publicized worldwide. In 1977, Oscar Rabin was placed under house arrest and shortly thereafter, the family was exiled from the USSR and stripped off their citizenship. However, this historical event forced the Soviets to change their stance regarding art.

They came to France without any money and not knowing a single word of French - they nevertheless continued pursuing their artistic passion, and gradually became famous painters.

It is a story about great talent and great love. One that shows what it is like to live in a totalitarian regime, while still trying to retain one's personal and artistic freedom, a story of people, who have created the very notion of nonconformist art, later called The Second Russian Avant-garde; who never betrayed their artistic principles and showed how powerful a weapon nonviolent resistance can be.

Production 
The pre-production started in 2008 when producer Alexander Smoljanski, who was then living in Paris, discovered that Russian painter Oscar Rabin lived next-door. After gathering more than 30 hours of interview footage, he invited Evegeniy Tsymbal to join the project which eventually was completed in summer 2015. It has since received positive reviews from critics and was awarded Best Documentary at various international film festivals.

Awards and nominations

References

External links 
 Trailer "In Search of a Lost Paradise"
 Soms-Films.com — Official Website
 Facebook —  Facebook page
 Interview with producer Alexander Smoljanski  (in Russian)
 Radio interview with producer Alexander Smoljanski  (in Russian)
 

Russian biographical films
Biographical documentary films
Documentary films about painters